Focker may refer to:

 "Focker" (song), a 2008 song by UK band Late of the Pier
 Fockers, a fictional family from the American comedy films Meet the Fockers and Little Fockers
 Gaylord "Greg" Focker, fictional character from the above two films and from their predecessor Meet the Parents
 Roy Focker, a fictional character from the Japanese anime series Macross

See also 
 Fokker (disambiguation)
 Fucker
 Focke-Wulf Flugzeugbau AG, German manufacturer of civil and military aircraft during World War II